The Battle of Syracuse was a naval engagement of the War of the Spanish Succession fought on 9 November 1710, outside the Sicilian port of Syracuse.  A French fleet of four ships under the command of Jacques Cassard came to relieve a heavily laden French merchant fleet that had been blockaded in the Syracuse harbour by a British fleet.  Cassard arrived off Syracuse when most of the blockading fleet had left to resupply at Port Mahon; he successfully captured Falcon and Pembroke, the two ships left to maintain the blockade, and escorted the fleet to Marseille.

References
 Norman, Charles Boswell. The corsairs of France
 Statham, Edward Phillips. Privateers and privateering

Naval battles of the War of the Spanish Succession
Conflicts in 1710
Naval battles involving Great Britain
Naval battles involving France
History of Syracuse, Sicily
Syracuse